Bağlarbaşı is an underground station on the M5 line of the Istanbul Metro in Üsküdar. It is located beneath Nuhsuyukuyu Avenue in Altunizade, Üsküdar. Connection to IETT city buses is available from at street level.

The station consists of an island platform with two tracks. Since the M5 is an ATO line, protective gates on each side of the platform open only when a train is in the station. Bağlarbaşı station was opened on 15 December 2017, together with eight other stations between Üsküdar and Yamanevler.

Station layout

References

Railway stations opened in 2017
Istanbul metro stations
2017 establishments in Turkey
Üsküdar